Sugarcreek is a borough in Venango County, Pennsylvania, United States. The population was 4,824 at the 2020 census. It is the largest borough by total area in all Venango County.

Geography
Sugarcreek is located at  (41.420993, -79.818883).

Demographics

As of the census of 2000, there were 5,331 people, 2,093 households, and 1,521 families residing in the borough. The population density was 142.7 people per square mile (55.1/km2). There were 2,245 housing units at an average density of 60.1 per square mile (23.2/km2). The racial makeup of the borough was 98.74% White, 0.32% African American, 0.13% Native American, 0.19% Asian, 0.11% from other races, and 0.51% from two or more races. Hispanic or Latino of any race were 0.28% of the population.

There were 2,093 households, out of which 28.5% had children under the age of 18 living with them, 59.8% were married couples living together, 9.1% had a female householder with no husband present, and 27.3% were non-families. 24.0% of all households were made up of individuals, and 11.5% had someone living alone who was 65 years of age or older. The average household size was 2.44 and the average family size was 2.88.

In the borough the population was spread out, with 21.9% under the age of 18, 6.7% from 18 to 24, 26.5% from 25 to 44, 25.8% from 45 to 64, and 18.9% who were 65 years of age or older. The median age was 42 years. For every 100 females there were 90.9 males. For every 100 females age 18 and over, there were 86.9 males.

The median income for a household in the borough was $31,952, and the median income for a family was $36,926. Males had a median income of $32,875 versus $21,996 for females. The per capita income for the borough was $16,873. About 8.8% of families and 10.8% of the population were below the poverty line, including 20.1% of those under age 18 and 0.9% of those age 65 or over.

References

 

Boroughs in Venango County, Pennsylvania
Populated places established in 1796
1796 establishments in Pennsylvania